Kubisz is a Polish surname, derived from the given name Kuba, which is a variant of Jakub. A similar surname is Kubiš. The name may refer to:

Jan Kubisz (1848–1929), Polish educator and writer
Marek Kubisz (born 1974), Polish footballer
Paweł Kubisz (1907–1968), Polish poet

References

Polish-language surnames